Club Esportiu Mediterrani is a sports club founded in 1931 by a group of sports enthusiasts in particular Swimming, who frequented the beach of Barceloneta and the swimming baths located in the delightful seaside neighborhood of Barcelona. They practice several sports, but mainly swimming and water polo.

The men's team enjoyed its peak between 1992 and 1994. In addition to chaining three national subchampionships, it won the 1993 national cup and it reached the 1994 LEN Cup Winners' Cup's final, lost to ASP Pescara. On the other hand, the women's team dominated the national championship through the 1990s with eight titles in a row.

Titles

Male team
Copa del Rey (1)
1993

Women's team
División de Honor (11)
1990, 1992, 1993, 1994, 1995, 1996, 1997, 1998, 1999, 2003, 2010
Copa de la Reina (5)
1997, 1998, 1999, 2000, 2003
Copa Catalunya (1)
2008

References

External links
Official website

Water polo clubs in Catalonia
Sports clubs in Barcelona
Sports clubs established in 1931